Alexander Toluboff (27 August 1882 – 1 July 1940) was a Russian Empire-born American art director. He was nominated for three Academy Awards in the category Best Art Direction. He was born in Lublin, Poland and died in Bloomfield Hills, Michigan.

Selected filmography
Toluboff was nominated for three Academy Awards for Best Art Direction:
 Vogues of 1938 (1937)
 Algiers (1938)
 Stagecoach (1939)

References

External links

Alexander Toluboff obituary

1882 births
1940 deaths
People from Lublin
People from Lublin Governorate
Congress Poland emigrants to the United States
American art directors
People from Bloomfield Hills, Michigan